Akbaş is a village in the District of Serik, Antalya Province, Turkey.

Zeytintaşı Cave, which is a natural monument registered show cave, is located close to the village.

References

Villages in Serik District